The Roman Catholic Diocese of Lisala is a Latin Catholic diocese  in the Ecclesiastical province of Mbandaka-Bikoro in the Democratic Republic of the Congo, named after its see, located in the city of Lisala.

History 
 Established on April 3, 1919, as Apostolic Vicariate (missionary, exempt pre-diocesan jurisdiction) of Nouvelle-Anvers, on territory split off from the then Apostolic Vicariate of Léopoldville
 Repeatedly lost territory, to establish Apostolic Prefecture of Tsuapa (1924.02.11),  Apostolic Prefecture of Coquilhatville (1926.01.28) and Apostolic Prefecture of Basankusu (1926.07.28).
 January 27, 1936: Renamed as Apostolic Vicariate of Lisala
 Lost territory on 1951.06.14 to establish Apostolic Prefecture of Isangi
 November 10, 1959: Promoted as Diocese of Lisala, becoming a suffragan of the Metropolitan Archbishop of Mbandaka-Bikoro
 Lost territory on 1964.11.25: Lost territory to establish Roman Catholic Diocese of Budjala

Bishops

Episcopal ordinaries
Nearly all (originally missionary) members of Latin Rite congregation Scheutists (C.I.C.M.)
 Vicars Apostolic of Nouvelle-Anvers (Latin Rite) 
 Bishop Egidio de Böck, C.I.C.M., Titular Bishop of Azotus (1921.01.04 – 1936.01.27 see below) (previously Apostolic Prefect of then Apostolic Prefecture of Kasaï Supérieur)

 Vicars Apostolic of Lisala  
 Bishop Egidio de Böck, C.I.C.M. (see above 1936.01.27 – 1944.12.20)
 Bishop François van den Berghe, C.I.C.M., Titular Bishop of Boseta (1944.12.20 – 1959.11.10 see below), previously coadjutor vicar apostolic (1943.02.09 – 1944.12.20)

 Bishops of Lisala 
 François van den Berghe, C.I.C.M. (see above 1959.11.10 – 1964.11.25)
 Louis Nganga a Ndzando (1964.11.25 – 1997.07.06), previously Auxiliary bishop (1961.04.18 – 1964.11.25); also Apostolic Administrator of Molegbe (1967 – 1968.09.05)
 Louis Nkinga Bondala, C.I.C.M. (1997.07.06 - 2015.02.11), previously coadjutor bishop (1996.03.13 – 1997.07.06); also Apostolic Administrator of Molegbe (2007.05.23 – 2009.11.14)
 Ernest Ngboko Ngombe, C.I.C.M. (2015.02.11 - 2019.11.23), Appointed Archbishop of Mbandaka-Bikoro
 Joseph-Bernard Likolo Bokal’Etumba (2021.02.15 - ...)

Coadjutor bishops
François Van den Berghe, C.I.C.M. (1943-1944), as Coadjutor Vicar Apostolic
Louis Nkinga Bondala, C.I.C.M. (1996-1997)

See also 
 Roman Catholicism in the Democratic Republic of the Congo

Source and External links 
 GCatholic.org
 Catholic Hierarchy

Roman Catholic dioceses in the Democratic Republic of the Congo
Christian organizations established in 1919
Roman Catholic Ecclesiastical Province of Mbandaka-Bikoro